In R v Mkize, an important case in South African criminal law, especially as it pertains to the defence of automatism, the accused was charged with the murder of his sister, whom he had stabbed to death. The court found, on a balance of probabilities, that he had suffered an attack known as "epileptic equivalent." He was therefore unconscious, without judgment or will or purpose or reasoning; the stabbing was a result of blind reflex activity. There was no intention to kill. The verdict, therefore, was "not guilty."

See also 
 Automatism (law)
 South African criminal law

References 
 R v Mkize 1959 (2) SA 260 (N).

Notes 

1958 in South African law
1958 in case law
South African criminal case law
KwaZulu-Natal Division cases